Brian John McDonald (3 September 1927 – 14 July 1988) was an Australian rules footballer who played with South Melbourne in the Victorian Football League (VFL).

McDonald was also a professional runner, winning the 1956 Dandenong Gift in the lead up to the Stawell Gift.

Notes

External links 

1927 births
Australian rules footballers from Melbourne
Sydney Swans players
1988 deaths
People from Collingwood, Victoria